Mark Burrell (b. 1957) is a British Artist,  born and resident in Lowestoft, Suffolk, UK. He spent a year during his childhood in Libya. Returning to Lowestoft he studied art at Lowestoft College but considers himself self-taught.

Burrell has won numerous prizes for his art including winning the Lucy Morrison Memorial Prize. His work has also featured in books and in magazines, including illustrations for 'The Iron Bridge' by John Ward.  He is also conjointly with Peter Rodulfo a leading member of the North Sea Magical Realists.

Critical appraisal
In a career now spanning several decades, Burrell has exhibited his paintings throughout East Anglia, London, and the US, receiving much critical acclaim, including the following -

 Burrell's work is obsessive and probing, revealing underlying elements that question ones sense of self. A psychotic surrealism that is a refreshing assault on ritualised aesthetics 

 The paintings by Mark Burrell convey rare command of a very peculiar and very English painter, for Mark is essentially a story teller who employs pigment rather than words to construct allegories, fables and fictions.  His fantastic narratives are as much concerned with plot, setting and character as they are with line space and colour.

 …(His) paintings are colourful and often very personal, and at times very mysterious indeed, these paintings can be looked at again and again, there are touches of humour as well as the darker side of life, from strange green beings growing out of bushes, communing with ghosts, to sheep in fields flying.

 Mark paints symbolist figurative oils with psychic, religious or political themes, often dealing with intense states of mind or emotion, a highly patterned world in beautiful states of decay. 

 His work has a visionary quality to it, which embraces deep rich colours of mysterious blues through to purples. The pictures come to life through delicate lighting whether it is a full moon, sunset, or from some magical source.

Media appearances

Burrell has frequently appeared on British TV including-

 * Anglia Television Programme: 'Coastal Inspiration's' Interviewed in the artists studio with work exhibited: Series on Lowestoft
 * BBC 2 TV Programme: Matter of Fact Cabbage Patch War (Nov 1996)
 * Anglia Television: 'The Front Row' Paintings Exhibited: Presented by Shaun Meo: November 1995
 * Anglia Television: 'Moving Art' Awarded First Prize. Presenter George Melly, interviewed by Sister Wendy Beckett and prize awarded by Bill Oddie: November 1991
 * Anglia Television: personal Interview and paintings exhibited: August 1991
 * Mustard TV: Work shown in documentary 'Bendy Caravans and Everlasting Pens written and produced by Nick Murray-Brown http://www.nickmurraybrown.co.uk/film.htm

Exhibitions 

2020

Chappel Galleries, Essex: New Year Selection

2019

Chappel Galleries, Essex: Solo Exhibition 
Easterly Artists: Lowestoft Heritage week, Suffolk: Mixed Exhibition
Open Studios, Lowestoft, Suffolk: Artist studio open to public
Easterly Artists, Britten Centre, Lowestoft, Suffolk: Mixed Exhibition
Ferini Art Gallery, Suffolk: The Four Marks: Four Man Show and video interview
Ferini Art Gallery, Suffolk: Resident Artist
Beccles Public Hall:  Documentary Film ‘Bendy Caravans’ shown to the public

2018
Skippings Gallery, Great Yarmouth, Norfolk: Two Man Exhibition Open Studios, Lowestoft, Suffolk: Artist studio open to public Ferini Art Gallery Suffolk: Resident Artist 

2017
Tripp Gallery London: The North Sea Magical Realists: Three Man Exhibition
Buckingham Gallery, Southwold, Suffolk
Open Studios: Artist studio open to public
Ferini Art Gallery Suffolk: Resident Artist

2016
Buckingham Gallery, Southwold
Suffolk Open Studios: Artist studio open to public
Ferini Art Gallery Suffolk: Resident Artist

2015
 Craft Co Art Gallery, Southwold, Suffolk: Two Person Exhibition Ferini Art Gallery, Suffolk: Resident Artist    Open Studios: Artist studio open to public

2014 
Ferini Art Gallery, Suffolk: Solo Exhibition with video interview 
Suffolk Open Studios, Lowestoft, Suffolk
Ferini Art Gallery, Suffolk: Resident Artist 
The Coconut Loft Art Gallery, Lowestoft, Suffolk: Opening Exhibition
Great Yarmouth Library, Norfolk: Two Man Exhibition with Peter Rodulfo

2013  
Assembly House Art Show: Arts Alive Norwich, Norfolk

2012
 West Halls Secret Postcard Auction: Patron, Her Royal Highness, The Duchess of Cambridge
 Other exhibitors included the Prime Minister David Cameron, Nick Clegg, Twiggy, Maggi Hambling, Bernard Hill, and Tessa Newcomb.

2011 
Assembly House Art Show: Flying Colours Fascinating Forms, Norwich Playhouse, Norfolk: Two Man Exhibition   Ferini Art Gallery, Suffolk: Summer Show

2010  
Ferini Art Gallery, Suffolk: Christmas Show 
Eastern Open, Kings Lynn, Norfolk

2008  
Norwich Castle Museum: Open Art Show: Chosen by William Boyer (Royal Academy), Benjamin Sullivan (Royal Portrait Society) and Peter Brown (N.E.A.C) Open Studios, Suffolk: Artist studio open to public  The Cut, Halesworth, Suffolk: Drawings and Paintings, accompanied by excerpts from the Poem ‘The Iron Bridge’, Written by John Ward. Ferini Art Gallery Lowestoft, Suffolk: Three Man Exhibition  The Cut Halesworth, Suffolk: Christmas Show Prize Winner of ‘The People’s Choice’

2007
The Cut Halesworth, Suffolk: Christmas Art Show’ Prize Winner of ’The People’s Choice’

2006
 Exhibited at The House of Commons Anglia Television: Part of the series ‘Coastal Inspirations’ filmed in Lowestoft Suffolk, Interviewed on Television and Work Exhibited2005 
Ferini Art Gallery, Suffolk: Drawings and paintings created for ‘The Iron Bridge’ book by John Ward  The Warehouse, Lowestoft, Suffolk:  Summer Show  The forum, Norwich, Norfolk: ‘Norwich Market’ Drawings exhibited  Open Studios, Lowestoft, Suffolk: Artist studio open to public  Eastern Open, Kings Lynn, Norfolk2004  
 Open Studios, Lowestoft, Suffolk
 ‘The Iron Bridge’ book. ‘Drawings and paintings’ by Mark Burrell: Author, John Ward2003 Cork Street Gallery, London Seachange Gallery, Great Yarmouth, Norfolk: Solo Exhibition  Interart Gallery, New York, USA  Galleriart – Kirkcudbright, Scotland   Williamsburg Historical Art Centre, New York, USA2001  
 Galerie de Vis Noorderhaven, Holland
 Gissing Hall, Gissing ‘Portrait Works’
 The Open Studios, Lowestoft, Suffolk
 Blackthorpe Barn, Roughman
 The New Wosley Theatre, Ipswich
 The John Russell Gallery, Ipswich2000 
 The Eastern Open, Kings Lynn
 Open Studios, Lowestoft, Suffolk
 Halesworth Gallery, Suffolk
 Yoxford Gallery, Yoxford
 Electric House Gallery, Ipswich
 Buckingham Galleries, Southwold
 The Affordable Art Fair, London
 Galerie de Vis Noorderhaven, Holland
 The Mall Galleries, London 'The Discerning Eye'
 Geneva Gallery – Lowestoft, Suffolk1999 
Chappell Galleries, Essex: Solo Exhibition Work Exhibited in Holland 
Lowestoft Town Hall, The Council Chambers, Suffolk
Suffolk Open Studios: Artist studio open to public
The Red Dot Gallery, Ipswich, Suffolk
Artists Gallery, Electric House, Ipswich, Suffolk 
The Yoxford Gallery, Suffolk  
Cottons Yard Gallery, Yoxford, Suffolk
Halesworth Gallery, Steeple End, Suffolk
Old Stable Gallery Diss, Norfolk
Raphael Gallery, Suffolk: Opening Exhibition
Open Studios Lowestoft Suffolk: Artist studio open to public
Chappell Galleries, EssexArtexpo, New York, U.S.A1998  
Chappell Galleries, Essex: Solo Exhibition
 Lowestoft Library, Lowestoft, Suffolk 
 The Yoxford Gallery, Yoxford
 Cottons Yard Gallery, Yoxford
 Halesworth Gallery, Steeple End
 Old Stable Gallery, Diss, Suffolk
 Raphael Gallery Open Studios1997  
 The Minories Art Gallery, Colchester, Essex
The Laing, National Art Competition, Raveningham, NorfolkThe Eastern Open, Kings Lynn Arts Centre, Norfolk
St Margaret’s Gallery, Norwich, Norfolk Works of the Imagination (Contemporary Figurative Exhibition)
Chappell Galleries, Essex1996 Eastern Open, Kings Lynn, Norfolk Arts Centre, Lowestoft, Suffolk: Various Dimensions
The Advice Arcade Gallery, Norwich, Norfolk: Summer Exhibition
Gallery, St George’s Street, Norwich, Norfolk
Regent Road Art Gallery, Lowestoft, Suffolk: Arts Forum
Halesworth Gallery, Steeple End, Suffolk1995 Le Chat, Noir Gallery, Mayfair, London Logos Art Gallery, Bloomsbury, LondonMall Galleries ‘The Discerning Eye’ London
Regent Road Art Gallery, Lowestoft, Suffolk: Art ForumNorwich Castle Museum, Norwich, Norfolk1994 Eastern Open, Kings Lynn Arts Centre, Norfolk: Painting Highly Commended 
Regent Road Art Gallery, Lowestoft, Suffolk: Solo Exhibition
The Corpusty Gallery, Norfolk: Three-Person ExhibitionThe Spectator, 7th National AwardThe Fruit market Gallery, Edinburgh 
Sotheby’s: New Bond Street, London1993 
 Contact Gallery, Norwich, Norfolk, The Human Condition: Three-Person Exhibition
Regent Road Art Gallery, Lowestoft, Suffolk: Arts Forum 
Chappel Galleries, Essex: Summer Exhibition
Gallery 12, B Fredrikstad, Norway 
Boundary Gallery, Cransfield, Suffolk  
Gallery 44, Aldeburgh, Suffolk: Solo ExhibitionCastle Museum, Norwich, Norfolk: Norfolk Art Now1992  Mall Galleries, London: Wilde Contemporary Art The Splinter Gallery, London: Painters Today  Boundary Gallery, Cransfield, Suffolk: Summer/Autumn Exhibition  The Gallery, 74 South Audley Street, London  Regent Road Art Gallery, Lowestoft, Suffolk Chappel Galleries, Essex  Cork Brick Gallery, Bungay, Suffolk: Christmas Exhibition Chappel Galleries, Essex: Christmas Exhibition1991  Eastern Open, Kings Lynn Arts Centre, Norfolk Boundary Gallery, Cransford, Suffolk – Easter Exhibition
The Picture Place, Lowestoft, Suffolk
Eastern Arts – Open Studio
Chappel Galleries, Essex  Royal Over Seas League, London: ‘A View of the New Exhibition: Lucy Morison Memorial Prize’ awarded for an Oil Painting
Norwich Artists Group, Norfolk
Kings Lynn Art Centre, Norfolk 
Norfolk and Norwich Festival: Open Studio
Boundary Gallery, Suffolk. Summer Exhibition and Christmas Show The Splinter Gallery, London1990  
 Regent Road Gallery, Lowestoft, Suffolk Chappel Galleries, Essex: Solo Exhibition
Centre d’Art Contemporain, Rouen, FranceThe Knapp Gallery, London
The Halesworth Gallery, Suffolk
Norwich School of Art, Norwich, Norfolk: Norwich Artists 
Boundary Gallery, Suffolk: Summer Exhibition
The School House Gallery, Norfolk1989   Eastern Open: The Fermoy Gallery, Kings Lynn
Norfolk Contact Gallery, Norwich, Norfolk: An Intensity of Vision
Castle Museum, Norwich, Norfolk: Art Now
Norwich School of Art, Norwich, Norfolk: Norwich Artists
Chappel Galleries, Essex: Summer Exhibition
Advice Arcade Gallery, Norwich, NorfolkNorwich 20 Group, Norwich, Norfolk
Art Auction Centre, Norwich Union Headquarters, Norfolk: In Aid of Third World  1988 Mall Galleries, London: Britain's Painters
Central Library, Great Yarmouth, Norfolk
Christie’s Assembly Rooms, Norwich
Norfolk: Cley mill Appeal1987'''    
The Royal Academy, London: Summer Exhibition

References

Links

Mark Burrell Art - Home Page

'Masks and Layers' a portrait of Mark Burrell by Ferini Films

Mark Burrells 'The Homing-ground' - All aboard the British transcendent locomotion.

Mark Burrell: North Sea Magical Realist artist extraordinaire

Nick Murray Brown Talking about The Iron Bridge and various news reels

1957 births
21st-century British artists
British contemporary artists
Living people
People from Lowestoft